The Lehman-Tunnell Mansion, also known as the Tunnell House, is a Queen Anne style house in Laramie, Wyoming, built in 1891. The house was built by Frank Cook for merchant Edward Lehman and his wife Pauline. In 1919 the Lehmans sold the house to Edward's business partner Frank J. Terry, who defaulted on his loan. During a period of bank ownership the house served for a time as the Kappa Delta sorority house for the University of Wyoming. In 1940 the house was sold to Dr. H.E. Tunnell, a chiropractor, and his wife Ida. Dr. Tunnell died in 1966 and his widow sold the house in 1970.

The rectangular brick house is 2-1/2 stories high with prominent chimneys. The stair landing features a stained glass window of unusual quality. Interior wood work was built by Frank Spiegelberg. The house has a strongly rusticated foundation. Curved arches emphasize the front windows and a projecting front porch, and the side bay follows a similar curving line in plan.

The Lehman-Tunnell Mansion was placed on the National Register of Historic Places on November 8, 1982.

References

External links
 Lehman-Tunnell Mansion at the Wyoming State Historic Preservation Office

National Register of Historic Places in Albany County, Wyoming
Queen Anne architecture in Wyoming
Buildings and structures completed in 1891
Sorority houses
History of women in Wyoming
Kappa Delta
1891 establishments in Wyoming